Dirk Dagger and the Fallen Idol is an adventure game by Jadestone published on the N-Gage 2.0 platform. The first episode in the Dirk Dagger series was released on August 19, 2008.

Story 
The player controles detective Dirk Dagger trying to solve various missions given to them. The first episode is called The Poochie Predicament and revolves around Dirk's partner Harry Cannon and a missing statue called the Fallen Idol.

Features 
 Use the phone's camera for looking around
 Classic film noir setting with a cartoon style to it
 Downloadable content - prolong the game by adding new adventures or "Episodes"

Development 
Dirk Dagger and the Fallen Idol was announced by Nokia on December 17. During development it was called Dirk Spanner and the Fallen Idol. The game won an IMG award for its gameplay at the Mobile World Congress in Barcelona 2008.

References

External links 
 Official website
 Game page at N-Gage's website
 Game page at Jadestone's website

2008 video games
Adventure games
Detective video games
N-Gage service games
Video games developed in Sweden
Nokia games